Makówka may refer to:

Makówka, Masovian Voivodeship, Poland
Makówka, Podlaskie Voivodeship, Poland